Michael Maguire (born 5 February 1974) is an Australian professional rugby league football coach who is the Head Coach of New Zealand at international level, and a former professional rugby league footballer who played as a er and  in the 1990s.

After a playing career spent mostly at the Canberra Raiders, with a brief stint with the Adelaide Rams, he became assistant coach of Melbourne Storm under Craig Bellamy and in 2009 became a head coach in the Super League with English club the Wigan Warriors. He was previously the head coach for the South Sydney Rabbitohs and the Wests Tigers in the NRL.

In his first year as Wigan Warriors' coach Maguire won the 2010 Super League Grand Final. In his second year he won the 2011 Challenge Cup and was then signed by the Rabbitohs. In his first year as an NRL head coach he took South Sydney deep into the 2012 finals series. In 2013, Souths finished the regular season in second place and in 2014 they won their first premiership in 43 years.

Background
Maguire was born in Canberra, Australia Capital Territory, Australia.

Playing career
After initially starting playing in rugby union, Maquire signed for NSWRL club the Canberra Raiders in 1991 and made his Winfield Cup début for the club off the bench against Manly-Warringah Sea Eagles in a narrow 14–15 loss.

Maguire did not feature again until 1994 when he came off the bench again against Penrith Panthers. He had a more consistent season the following year, making six appearances in total, most of which he started as either wing or centre. Maguire's first try came as a centre against the Parramatta Eels.

In 1997 Maguire left Canberra and signed for the new Adelaide Rams club in the breakaway Australian Super League competition. He made his début at fullback in the Rams inaugural game against the North Queensland Cowboys in Townsville which Adelaide lost 24–16. Maguire also participated in the World Club Challenge for the Rams that year. He went on to play four more games for Adelaide and scored one try before returning to Canberra in 1998. Maguire made two appearances for Canberra in 1998 before retiring after persistent neck problems.

Coaching career
When Maguire retired from playing he initially left the game and taught physical education before signing as a strength and conditioning coach for Canberra. He later became an assistant coach for the Raiders' reserve grade under Mal Meninga. Maguire was eventually promoted to assistant coach of the Canberra first team alongside Matthew Elliott, before leaving the club in 2004 to take the assistant coaching job at Melbourne Storm under a former Raiders teammate, Craig Bellamy.

Maguire was an integral part in Melbourne's stripped NRL premierships and took control of first team affairs when head coach Bellamy took up representative duties for the Blues in State of Origin. This earned him plaudits from senior coaches in the NRL and Maguire was linked with a move to Brisbane Broncos as head coach in 2008. He was heavily linked with a move to English club Wigan Warriors towards the end of the 2009 season and signed a three-year deal with the Super League side on 7 October 2009.

Wigan Warriors
Maguire started his Wigan coaching career with a victory against the Crusaders in his first home match of the season. He ended the Halliwell Jones hoodoo (Wigan hadn't won a competitive game away at Wire since they last played at Wilderspool) against Warrington in a thrilling match which Wigan won 22–20. He won RLW coach of the month for February. Maguire then recorded his biggest victory as a Wigan coach, beating nearest rivals St. Helens in the last ever Good Friday derby match at Knowsley Road. He and his assistant Shaun Wane helped guide Wigan to the League Leaders' Shield in 2010. This was the first time Wigan topped the table in 10 years and marked a trophy winning start to "Madge's" Wigan coaching tenure. Maguire guided Wigan to their first Super League Grand Final appearance in seven years as the Wigan club beat Leeds in a semi-final at Headingley by a scoreline of 26–6 on 25 September 2010. Maguire was crowned Coach of the Year 2010 at the annual Super League 'Man of Steel' awards dinner.

Maguire managed the Wigan side to their first Super League Grand Final win in over 10 years beating their arch rivals in the 2010 Super League Grand Final victory over St. Helens at Old Trafford.

The following February his Wigan side took on 2010 NRL premiers St. George Illawarra Dragons in the 2011 World Club Challenge but were defeated. In 2011 Maguire announced his resignation from Wigan, in order to replace the retiring John Lang as head coach of National Rugby League club the South Sydney Rabbitohs for the 2012 NRL season.

Maguire coached Wigan to the 2011 Challenge Cup Final victory over the Leeds Rhinos at Wembley Stadium.

South Sydney Rabbitohs
Maguire joined the South Sydney Rabbitohs in October 2011, after the end of the NRL and Super League seasons. He had signed a contract with the club earlier in the year, to replace the retiring John Lang. The Rabbitohs performed well during the 2012 NRL season with Maguire credited for the successful move of Greg Inglis from centre to full-back. The team progressed to within one game of the 2012 NRL Grand Final.  The following year, Maguire guided Souths to within one game of the 2013 NRL Grand Final but the club were defeated 30–20 by Manly-Warringah in the preliminary final.

In the 2014 NRL season, Souths were tipped to be winners of the minor premiership, along with the Sydney Roosters and Manly-Warringah Sea Eagles. The first finals round saw Souths defeat Manly, then facing the Roosters in the preliminary final. Unlike the last round of the ordinary season, Souths overcome an early 12–0 deficit to score 32 unanswered points, eventually winning the match 32–22. Under Maguire's coaching this was the first time since 1971 that South Sydney had reached a grand final. Souths defeated the Canterbury-Bankstown Bulldogs 30–6 in the 2014 NRL Grand Final, securing their 21st premiership and their first since 1971.  In September 2017, Maguire was terminated as coach of South Sydney despite having two years remaining on his contract.

Wests Tigers
On 28 October 2018, Maguire was announced as Head coach of Wests Tigers for the next three years.  In his first year in charge of the Wests Tigers, Maguire guided the club to a ninth-place finish narrowly missing out on the finals.

In round 4 of the 2020 NRL season, Wests lost 28–23 to the struggling Gold Coast side giving them their first win in 364 days.  In the post match press conference, Maguire spoke to the media saying I'm sick and tired of the ups and downs of the performances. We need to change that. That's what this club has been, I didn't want to say that, but it's the truth. and the truth is we need to fix how we do things when we are performing".

During the half-time interval in round 12 of the 2020 NRL season, Maguire was seen on a dressing room camera berating his players for their poor first half performance against the New Zealand Warriors.  Maguire was then seen kicking a chair across the room.

At the end of his second year in charge of the Wests Tigers, the club finished a disappointing 11th on the table and missed out on the finals.  Wests were also one of only five teams to concede over 500 points in the 2020 NRL season.

In the 2021 NRL season, Maguire guided the Wests Tigers to a disappointing 13th placed finish on the table including a 38-0 loss against Wooden Spoon side Canterbury in the last round.  After the season had concluded, Maguire's position as head coach came under intense scrutiny but on 21 September 2021, the Wests Tigers board declared that Maguire would continue as head coach in 2022.

On 6 June 2022, Wests Tigers announced Maguire had been terminated as head coach with the club sitting 13th on the table.  He was replaced by interim coach Brett Kimmorley.

Honours
Wigan Warriors:

Grand Final: 1
2010

League Leaders' Shield: 1
2010

Challenge Cup: 1
2011

South Sydney Rabbitohs

National Rugby League Premierships: 1
 2014

NRL Auckland Nines: 1
 2015

World Club Challenge: 1
 2015

References

External links
Wests Tigers profile
South Sydney Rabbitohs profile
Michael Maguire profile

1975 births
Living people
Adelaide Rams players
Australian rugby league coaches
Australian rugby league players
Canberra Raiders players
New Zealand national rugby league team coaches
Rugby league centres
Rugby league fullbacks
Rugby league players from Canberra
Rugby league wingers
South Sydney Rabbitohs coaches
Wests Tigers coaches
Wigan Warriors coaches
Australian expatriate sportspeople in New Zealand
Australian expatriate sportspeople in England